Valhelhas is a parish (freguesia) in the municipality of Guarda in Portugal. The population in 2011 was 396, in an area of 20.18 km2.

References

Freguesias of Guarda, Portugal